The Gajapati Empire, was an empire established by the Suryavamsa (IAST: Sūryavaṃśa, "Solar dynasty") dynasty, which was a medieval dynasty from the Indian subcontinent, it originated in the region of Trikalinga (most of the present-day Odisha and North coastal Andhra) and reigned from 1434 to 1541 CE. It succeeded the reign of the Eastern Gangas. Under Kapilendra Deva, Gajapati empire stretched from lower Ganga in the north to Kaveri in the south.

The Gajapati dynasty was established by Emperor Kapilendra Deva (1434–66 CE) in 1434. During the reign of Kapilendra Deva, the borders of the empire expanded immensely; Gajapati Empire acquired large parts of Andhra Pradesh and western regions of West Bengal, it also included the eastern and central parts of Madhya Pradesh and Jharkhand. Purushottama Deva and Prataparudra Deva are the significant rulers of this dynasty. The last ruler Kakharua Deva was killed by Govinda Vidyadhara in 1541, who founded the Bhoi dynasty.

The Gajapati kings patronized Vaishnavism and were ardent devotees of Lord Vishnu. They also build many temples dedicated to Lord Vishnu.

Etymology 
In Odia, "Gaja" means elephant and "Pati" means master or husband. As such, Gajapati etymologically means a king with an army of elephants.

History
The region known as Kalinga (present-day Odisha) was controlled by the Odia rulers Eastern Gangas.The early Eastern Gangas ruled from Kalinga-nagara (Mukhalingam near Srikakulam, Andhra Pradesh). They shifted their capital to Cuttack in the 13th century. Religious leader Ramanujacharya had a great influence on the Raja Choda Ganga Deva, who renovated the temple at Puri. Narasingha Deva built the Sun Temple at Konark and Varaha Lakshmi Narasimha temple, Simhachalam at Visakhapatnam. The Gangas were succeeded by the Gajapati rulers. Two copper plates of the early Pallava dynasty have been found in the Kolleru Lake, traced to Gajapati Langula Narasimha Deva, an Oriya ruler (Odia Raja). According to legend, the Gajapati fort was located at Kolleti Kota on one of the eastern islands of the lake, which protected the Odia forces. The enemy general encamped at Chiguru Kota located on the shores and tried to excavate a channel in the modern-day Upputeru, so that the water of the lake would empty into the sea and allow an attack on the Gajapati fort.

The Gajapatis of Odisha, at the height of their power in the 15th century, ruled over an empire extending from the Ganges in the north near Hoogly to the kaveri in the south under Gajapati Kapilendra Deva. But by the early 16th century, the Gajapatis lost great portions of their southern dominion to Vijayanagar and Golconda. This period was marked by the influence of Chaitanya Mahaprabhu and by the expansion of Jaganatha temple across the length and breadth of the empire. One of the causes of the reduction in militarism of the population has been attested to the Bhakti movement initiated by Sri Chaitanya Mahaprabhu, who arrived in the empire at the time of Emperor Prataparudra and stayed for 18 long years at Puri. Emperor Prataparudra was highly influenced by the works of Chaitanya and gave up the military tradition of the Odia emperors. He retired himself into the life of an ascetic leaving the future of the empire uncertain. Govinda Vidyadhara took the opportunity to murder the sons of the emperor and usurped the throne himself and carved out the destruction of the once mighty empire.

Gajapati military
The records of the Suryavamsi Gajapatis gives a picture of their military administration which they had inherited from the Eastern Gangas rulers. The Gangas had a vast and well-organised military which was improved by Kapilendra Deva. The empire was built on the lines of a military state, with the protection of the state and its expansion being the responsibilities of the state and population. Militarism had penetrated into different ranks of the society and the king had a large standing army which included a large number of soldiers and local-militants in the standing army. Besides the feudal tributary states of Odisha also provided a stipulated number of soldiers at the time of war and had to fight for the Gajapati in the battle field.

Military titles
Some of the military titles include:

Senapati, Champati, Routray, Paikaray (commander of the cavalry), Sahani (commander of elephant force), Dandapata, Dandasena, Paschimakavata, Uttarakavata (guardian of the marches), Samantray, Bidyadhara, Bhramarabara, Harichandana, Jagadeva, Mardaraja, Samantasimhara, Raya, Singha, Mansingha, Baliarsingha, Pahadasingha, Nayaka, Pattanayaka, Dandanayaka, Gadanayaka, Patra, Mohapatra, Behera, Dalabehera, Jena, Badajena, Pradhana, Samala, Routa, Khuntia, Parichha, Parija, Padhihari, Dandapani

Gajapati military divisions

The Odia poet Sarala Das who lived during the era of Kapilendra Deva, has given descriptions about the military divisions in his Odia Mahabharata. The divisions mentioned are:-

 Hantakaru Dala: The first division of the army. It was in the forefront of the marching army and was responsible forward scouting, clearing jungles and marking roads for the army. It was equivalent to the engineering division of the modern armies of the world.

 Aguani Thata: The advance units or the first in line to march or charge in the battle formations. The division marched ahead of the main army.
 Dhenkiya: The attack groups
 Banua/Dhanuki: The archers
 Cavalry

 Pradhana Vala: The main division of the army with maximum concentration of the soldiers.
 Dhenkiya: Warriors wielding Sword and Shield. Forming the frontline of battalion.
 Banua: Marksmen with poisoned arrow and composite bows with formidably accurate shots.
 Phadikara: The fighters bearing mostly close combat weapons. They wore leather armor.
 Cavalry
 Elephant Corps
 Itakara: Mainly used for motivating the army with war time music and dance with Ghumura. Carried with them various musical instruments and reported to the officer with the rank of Bahubalendra, in charge of non-combatants.

 Pachhiani Thata: The fourth and the rear division guarding the flanks.

 Angavala: The groups with the main bodyguards of the monarchs, other royalties, commander, military generals and officers.

 Paridhana: The detachments with commanding officers and fort duty officers left in charge of the captured territory and forts. The rank of the officer involved in this division  is Nayak or Gadanayak.
 Dhenkiya
 Banua
 Phadikara
 Prahari: The guards on duty and also serve as military police at home.

Gajapati Infantry units

The infantry units of the Gajapati military are as follows:

 Dala: Band of 27 Paikas, mostly from the same locality and commanded by an officer with the rank of Dalabehera.

 Bhuiyan: A platoon of 70 Paikas and commanded by an officer with the rank of Paikaray.

 Vahini: A brigade consisting of multiple Bhuiyan platoons and commanded by an officer with the rank of Vahinipati.

 Chamu: An entire regiment of the army consisting multiple Vahinis and commanded by an officer with the rank of Chamupati or Champati.

Military instruments and weapons
The different musical instruments used to motivate soldiers during the march and warfare. The names of the music instruments include Damalu, Damame, Tamaka, Bizighosa, Daundi, Ghumura, Bheri, Turi, Ranasingha etc. The names of the weapons used by the Gajapati army are also mentioned like Dhanu, Trona, Sara, Asi, Parigha, Pattisa, Kunta, Jathi, Buruja, Saveli etc. Information with regards to breaking of the gateways and the walls of the fort with the help of horses, elephants and iron instruments are also found in the same text.

Contemporary sources
Other contemporary sources also give accounts about the characteristics of the Gajapati military. Muslim texts like Buhan-m-Mansir gives accounts of Kapilendra Deva having an elephant force numbering two hundred thousand. This number of war elephants is usually a very huge number compared even to any military of the existing kingdoms during the times of Kapilendra Deva himself in India. Nizzamuddin writes that the Gajapati encamped on the Godavari river banks with an infantry of seven hundred thousand. Fernão Nunes. the Portuguese traveler who spent three years at Vijayanagara, the capital of the Vijayanagara Empire estimates size of the army of Prataparudra Deva to the extent of 13,000 elephants, 20,000 horses, while fighting against the Vijayanagara Empire and also praises that the Odia soldiers were excellent fighters. Rayavachakamu also gives interesting accounts about the feats and exercises practised by the Odia soldiers at their capital at Cuttack.

Descendants

Talcher branch

During the reign of Purushottama Deva, the overlordship of Bhimanagari was established in 1471 CE in the region by Narahari Singh who was the scion of the family of the ruling Suryavanshi Gajapati Kings of Odisha. Later in 1578 under the reign of Padmanabha Birabara Harichandan, the kingdom was renamed as Talcher after the name of the family goddess Taleshwari. The kingdom acceded to India and merged into the state of Odisha following independence in 1947.

Rulers 
List of Rulers

Gallery

See also
 Eastern Ganga dynasty
 Poosapati

References

Bibliography
 
 

Dynasties of India
States and territories established in 1434
History of Odisha
History of Andhra Pradesh
Dynasties of Odisha
Culture of Andhra Pradesh
Hindu dynasties
Suryavansha
States and territories disestablished in 1541
1434 establishments in Asia
15th-century establishments in India
1541 disestablishments in India
Former empires